TDI may refer to:

Science and technology
 Tolerable daily intake, in toxicology
 Toluene diisocyanate, an organic chemical
 Time delay and integration, timing synchronization in an image sensor
 Tissue Doppler imaging, a medical ultrasound technology
 Tabbed document interface, a type of graphical user interface
 Total dual integrality, a property of matrices in mathematical optimization
 Transport Driver Interface, used by NT series Windows to abstract level 7 APIs into a common protocol for the Transport Protocol layer
 Telecom data intelligence, ability to extract detailed customer profiling data
 Trophic Diatom Index, water quality and ecological status; see Sattal
 Turbocharged Direct Injection, a diesel engine design used in cars and light vans made by Volkswagen Group

Organizations
 Technical Diving International, a technical diving organization
 Telecommunications for the Deaf, Inc., a nonprofit organization promoting telecommunications devices for the deaf
 Texas Department of Insurance
 The Dartmouth Institute for Health Policy and Clinical Practice, a subsidiary of Dartmouth College
 Transportation Displays, Inc., a unit of Outfront Media

Entertainment
 Total Drama Island, an animated reality series
 Tangerine Dream Independent, the record label belonging to Edgar Froese